Maël Lépicier (born 14 January 1986) is a professional footballer who plays for as a centre-back for RJ Rochefort FC. Born in France, he made 20 appearances for the Republic of the Congo national team between 2011 and 2016.

Career
On 1 October 2019, Lépicier signed with Royale Jeunesse Rochefort FC.

Personal life
Lépicier is the cousin of the French tennis player Jo-Wilfried Tsonga.

References

External links
 
 
 
 

1986 births
Living people
Footballers from Le Mans
Association football central defenders
French footballers
French sportspeople of Republic of the Congo descent
Republic of the Congo people of French descent
Republic of the Congo footballers
Republic of the Congo international footballers
R.E. Virton players
R.A.E.C. Mons players
Beerschot A.C. players
Royal Antwerp F.C. players
K.S.V. Roeselare players
Le Mans FC players
SO Châtellerault players
FC Martigues players
Belgian Pro League players
Challenger Pro League players
Republic of the Congo expatriate footballers
Expatriate footballers in Belgium
Expatriate footballers in France
Republic of the Congo expatriate sportspeople in Belgium
Republic of the Congo expatriate sportspeople in France
Black French sportspeople